Victoria Tower Gardens is a public park along the north bank of the River Thames in London, adjacent to the Victoria Tower, at the south-western corner of the Palace of Westminster. The park, extends southwards from the Palace to Lambeth Bridge, between Millbank and the river. It forms part of the Thames Embankment.

Victoria Tower Gardens is a Grade II* listed park created in two stages in 1879–81 and 1913–14. It is in a conservation area, is partly within the UNESCO World Heritage Site of Westminster, and is designated a zone of Monument Saturation.

History

The northern part of the gardens was acquired by the Government under the Houses of Parliament Act 1867 in order to reduce the fire risk to the Palace of Westminster from the wharves there. There was disagreement about whether at least some of the land should be built on, but eventually the newspaper retailer William Henry Smith donated £1000 towards laying it out as an open space and Parliament paid the remaining £1400 needed. The gardens opened in 1881. The Government promised Smith that the land would be maintained as a recreation ground.

A private scheme to rebuild the area south of the gardens was discussed in Parliament in 1898 in the Victoria Embankment extension and St John's Improvement Bill, and was rejected because it did not include extending the Gardens. London County Council then brought forward its own scheme for widening Millbank, extending the Thames embankment and enlarging the open space southwards to Lambeth Bridge. The Commissioners of Works were expected to give up a small part of the existing Gardens for the road widening, and, in order to honour the promise to Smith, insisted that it be expressly provided in the Act authorising the scheme that the new land between Millbank and the river be laid out as a garden. Consequently the London County Council (Improvements) Act 1900, which authorised the scheme, provided that the new land between Millbank and the Thames should be "laid out and maintained ... for use as a garden open to the public and as an integral part of the existing Victoria Tower Garden". The new land was laid out as a garden in 1913-14 and opened to the public on 30 June 1914.

A number of wharves were compulsorily purchased under the 1900 Act, including Dorset Wharf which was purchased from George Taverner Miller, son of Taverner John Miller, from where he ran a "Sperm Oil Merchants and Spermaceti refining" business. The effects from this business and others were sold in 1905.

The original gardens had a formal layout, with a central shrubbery. The garden was replanned with a less formal layout in 1913–14, with a shrubbery further south. In 1956 the shrubbery and trees in the lawns were removed in order to provide more of a parkland atmosphere and an uninterrupted view of the Palace of Westminster. The changes included (in 1957) erection in the Gardens of the Buxton Memorial. The present layout is essentially that of 1956–57.

Features

The park features:
A cast of the sculpture The Burghers of Calais by Auguste Rodin, purchased by the British government in 1911 and positioned in the gardens in 1914.
A 1930 statue of the suffragette Emmeline Pankhurst by Arthur George Walker, now entitled the Emmeline and Christabel Pankhurst Memorial
The Buxton Memorial Fountain – originally constructed in Parliament Square, this was removed in 1940 and placed in its present position in 1957. It was commissioned by Charles Buxton MP to commemorate the Act of 1833 abolishing slavery in British-ruled territories, dedicated to his father Thomas Fowell Buxton, and designed by Gothic architect Samuel Sanders Teulon (1812–1873) in 1865.
 A stone wall with two modern-style goats with kids – situated at the southern end of the Gardens.
 From 4 to 11 August 2014 the light installation spectra by Japanese artist Ryoji Ikeda was situated in the gardens to commemorate the centenary of the start of the First World War.

Proposed UK Holocaust Memorial
In January 2015 Prime Minister David Cameron announced on behalf of the Holocaust Memorial Foundation that there was to be a new UK Holocaust Memorial and associated Learning Centre built in central London. At that stage three particular sites were proposed: the Imperial War Museum, Potter's Field near London City Hall, and on Millbank, south of the Houses of Parliament in Westminster. However, on 27 January 2016 he announced that Victoria Tower Gardens had been chosen for the memorial. It later became clear that the learning centre was also to be built in the Gardens, although this was never formally announced. A design competition was launched, and in October 2017 the UK Holocaust Memorial Foundation jury announced their chosen design. The proposed construction was submitted for planning permission to Westminster City Council which had to consider breaching its own rules on new monuments in this zone and the effect on heritage views of the Palace of Westminster. The memorial plans attracted strong opposition to the use of this small park, both from the grassroots campaign of local residents through the 'Save Victoria Tower Gardens'  and international organisations like the UNESCO advisor ICOMOS. On 8 April 2022, at judicial review, the High Court quashed the planning permission. The Government has requested leave to appeal.

Transport
The nearest London Underground stations are Westminster and Pimlico.

References

External links

Boundary Commission map from 1885
Waterloo, Westminster, Lambeth map 1896
Save Victoria Tower Gardens
High Court judgement of 8 April 2022

 
1870s establishments in England
Parks and open spaces in the City of Westminster
Palace of Westminster